Maurice Robert (21 April 1930 – 8 December 2022) was a French academic and ethnologist.

Biography
Robert died in Limoges on 8 December 2022, at the age of 92.

Publications
Vanniers et vannerie du Limousin et de La Marche (with others) (1964)
Étude d'une communauté artisanale et d'une technique traditionnelle : vanniers et vannerie du Limousin et de la Marche (1967)
Dictionnaire de la langue limousine, diciounàri de lo lingo limousino (1968)
Louis dô Limousi, petit paysan du xixe siècle (1972)
Les poteries populaires et les potiers du Limousin et de la Marche (1972)
Parler limousin—Parlar limousi (1977)
Les Limousins des années 30 (1990)
Études sur la vie politique et les forces électorales en Limousin : 1871-1973
Les maisons limousines
Une ville dans son pays : Aubusson hier et aujourd'hui
Mémoire et identité (1991)
La maison et le village en Limousin, habitat rural et communauté paysanne (1993)
Le guide la Haute-Vienne (1995)
Maisons paysannes d'Auvergne (1992)
Les mots du Limousin (1997)
Haute-Vienne (1997)
L'eau et la lumière, Bourganeuf (1998)
Les Artisans et les métiers (1999)
Patrimoine de pays (1999)
Le pays de Châlus, hier et aujourd'hui (2000)
La Haute-Vienne, séductions limousines (2000)
Le Paysan d'autrefois en Limousin (2002)
Magie, sorcellerie et guérissage en Limousin (2003)
La Haute-Vienne à tire-d'aile (2003)
Les Granges (2004)
Artisans et Métiers en Limousin
Les mots limousins du village (2007)
Creuse (2007)
Pageas en Limousin, Canton de Châlus, Histoire, Patrimoine, Tradition (2007)
Solignac en Limousin (2007)
Boire un petit coup... jusqu'à la biture ? (2008)
La pomme de terre, que d'histoire(s) (2008)
Le fils du métayer (roman) (2011)
Retour à la terre-Patrimoine funéraire en Limousin (2012)
Limousin, corps et âme (2012)
Petite histoire du Limousin (2014)
A Dieu ne (dé)plaise (2016)
Le Limousin entre Abandon et Zizanie (2016)
Magie, sorcellerie et guérissage en limousin (2017)
Histoire du Limousin (2018)
Blagues, proverbes, contes et chansons en Limousin (2019)
Ce Limousin que j'aime (2021)

References

1930 births
2022 deaths
French ethnologists
People from Haute-Vienne
French National Centre for Scientific Research scientists
Academic staff of the University of Bordeaux
Academic staff of Aix-Marseille University
Academic staff of the University of Limoges
Research directors of the French National Centre for Scientific Research